Life's a Bitch is the sixth full-length album by the English heavy metal band Raven, released in 1987. It was the last album to feature original drummer/founding member Rob Hunter.

Track listing

Personnel

Raven
John Gallagher – bass, vocals
Mark Gallagher – guitar
Rob Hunter – drums

Production 
Chris Icsa – producer, engineer, mixing with Raven
Tom Chadley – assistant engineer
Dennis King – mastering at Atlantic Studios, New York
Bob Defrin – art direction

References

1987 albums
Raven (British band) albums
Atlantic Records albums